Highland Spring is a Scottish supplier of natural source bottled water. It produces still and sparkling water at its factory in Blackford, Perth and Kinross, although despite the name this area is not within the Scottish Highlands. Its water is sourced from protected, organic land in the Ochil Hills.

Highland Spring is the UK's leading natural source water brand. UK sales volumes grew by 6.3% to 348.6 million litres in 2021, securing a healthy market share of 10.0% of the total UK plain packaged water volumes.

The company has expanded through organic growth  and also by acquisition, taking over the Gleneagles Spring Water Company, also based in Blackford, in 2001, the Speyside Glenlivet Water Company, based in Ballindalloch in 2009, and acquiring Campsie Spring (Glasgow) from Greencore in 2010. The company formally ceased production at the Speyside Glenlivet Water Company site in 2020.

Simon Oldham and Mark Steven were appointed Joint Managing Directors in August 2021, following Les Montgomery's retirement from as Chief Executive after 36 years with the business. The company is owned by billionaire UAE businessman Mahdi Al Tajir.

In June 2018, the company became the first UK water brand to introduce and trial a 100% recycled and recyclable plastic bottle in a bid to cut plastic waste. Following the success of the trial, in January 2019, it formally launched a commercial bottle range that was 100% recycled and recycled called "Eco-Bottle". As of 2020, its entire "Eco-Bottle" sub-range is made from 100% recycled PET plastic. 

In August 2022 the business launched a landmark rail freight facility adjacent to its headquarters in Blackford, the facility which has been 10 years in development is part of their ambition to reach net zero by 2040.

References

External links 
Highland Spring official site
Highland Spring Group official site 

Bottled water brands
Companies based in Perth and Kinross
Scottish brands